Sara M. Harvey (born March 11, 1976) is an American costume designer, and an author of fiction and nonfiction, most notably having written multiple articles for the Greenwood Encyclopedia of Clothing Through World History.  She is a regular speaker on the subjects of costume design at science-fiction conventions, and has won awards for her plus-sized creations.

Early life

Harvey was born in San Leandro, California, and grew up in the East Bay area of Castro Valley, California. She graduated from Moreau Catholic High School and attended college at the University of Puget Sound in Tacoma, Washington, and California State University, East Bay in Hayward, California before earning a Bachelor of Arts in theater arts with an emphasis in costume design from the University of California, Santa Cruz.  She later received a Master of Arts in visual culture, with an emphasis in costume history, from New York University.

Costuming 
Harvey spent several years working for the costume department of the Renaissance Entertainment Corporation on events held in California and Wisconsin. She also spent a year and three months working in the Creative Costume Department of Walt Disney World in Orlando (Lake Buena Vista), Florida.

She was an instructor of design and fashion history at the International Academy of Design and Technology branch in Nashville, Tennessee, known as IADT Nashville, which has since closed. She makes frequent appearances at conventions, speaking about and demonstrating costuming techniques at conferences such as Arisia, MidSouthCon, Hypericon, and Archon.

Harvey lives in Nashville, Tennessee with her husband and child.

Published works

Fiction
 Music City, June 2014, Mother of Muses Publishing, 
 Seven Times a Woman, November 2011, New Babel Books, 
 The Tower of the Forgotten, July 2011, Apex Book Company, 
 Labyrinth of the Dead, June 2010, Apex Book Company, 
The Convent of the Pure, April 2009, Apex Book Company, 
"Lost and Found," March 2009, short story, Kerlak Publishing, appearing in the Dragons Composed anthology.
"The Muse," December 2007, short story, Circle Dark Publishing e-book anthology Twilight and Thorns.
A Year and a Day, August 2006, paperback novel, Premium Press America under Long Meadow Books imprint,

Non-fiction
The American Beauty Industry, 2010, Greenwood Publishing Group. Harvey contributed entries on fashion magazines, wigs, the "Natural Look," fashion designers, retail, and manufacturing.
Encyclopedia of World Dress and Costume, 2010, Greenwood Publishing Group. Harvey contributed chapters on Italy, Portugal, and the United Kingdom.
 
Clothing in World History, December 2007, Greenwood Publishing Group:
 Costumes and history of ancient Persia
 
 The 1960s and 1970s.

References

External links
Official Web site

21st-century American novelists
American information and reference writers
American women novelists
Women science fiction and fantasy writers
Novelists from Tennessee
1976 births
Living people
California State University, East Bay alumni
21st-century American women writers
People from San Leandro, California
People from Castro Valley, California
Novelists from California
American women non-fiction writers
21st-century American non-fiction writers